Anfillo (also known as Mao or Southern Mao) is a Northern Omotic language spoken in western Ethiopia by a few hundred people. The term Anfillo is used to refer both to the language and the people found in a small community in the Anfillo woreda, part of the Mirab Welega Zone. The language is on the verge of extinction as it is spoken only by adults above the age of sixty. All younger generations have shifted to Western Oromo as of 2007.

Anfillo has five vowels and about 22 consonants. Long vowels and consonants do occur and may have phonemic value. The basic word order is subject–object–verb. Nouns follow their modifier. Verbs are inflected for tense, aspect and mood. Three tenses are marked morphologically: present, past, and future. Gender and number are expressed lexically.

Notes

References
 Amanuel Alemayehu (2001) 'Noun Phrase in Anfillo' (unpublished B.A. thesis, Addis Abeba University)
 Gebre Bizuneh (1994) 'The Phonology of Anfillo' (unpublished M.A. thesis, Addis Abeba University)
 Goshu, Debela & Demeke, Girma Awgichew [2005] 'Some points on Anfillo' (unpublished handout, International Conference on Endangered Ethiopian Languages, Addis Ababa 27–30 April 2005).
 Grottanelli, Vinigi L. 1940. I Mao (Missione etnografica nel Uollega occidentale). Rome: Reale Accademia d'Italia.
 Yigezu, Moges & Yehualashet (1995) 'Anfillo: a sketch of grammar and lexicon', Afrikanistisch Arbeitspapiere, 43. Cologne: University of Cologne/Institute of African Studies.
 Yigezu, Moges (1995b) 'Dying twice: the case of Anfillo languages', Afrikanistisch Arbeitspapiere, 43. Cologne: University of Cologne/Institute of African Studies.
 Wedekind, Klaus & Wedekind, Charlotte (2002) 'Sociolinguistic Survey Report on Languages of the Asosa-Begi-Komosha area, Part II' (SIL Electronic Survey Report 2002-055). [contains a map]

Endangered languages of Africa
North Omotic languages
Languages of Ethiopia